Del Toro Lake is a lake located in the Magallanes Region, southern Chile. The lake is also known as Lago del Toro or Lago Toro (in English Lake Bull) and its name comes from the lake's ability to generate 4 m  swells due to a long (~30 km) fetch and high winds aligned with the long axis of the lake.  Locals say that the lake and the nearby mountain Sierra del Toro is named thus because the lake 'is angry a lot'.  Services on the lake include camping and fishing at Bahia el Bote.

See also
Cerro Toro
Salto Grande

References

Toro
Lakes of Magallanes Region